Jalan Tambun (Perak state route A13) is a major road in Perak, Malaysia. It is considered known as Ipoh Outer Ring Road.

List of junctions

Tambun
Ipoh Outer Ring Road